Richard Burke (1807 or 1808 - 1870) was a Baptist preacher and state representative in Alabama. He was involved in the Union League. A few nights after a political meeting of African Americans, he was murdered. In Sumter County numerous African American Union League members were shot.

Burke was born in Virginia. Burke established a school for African Americans in Sumter County, Alabama and represented the county in the Alabama House of Representatives in 1869 and 1870.

Turner Reavis owned Burke when he was enslaved and testified about his activity at the political meeting and his murder during hearing in the U.S. Congress investigating activities of the Ku Klux Klan.

See also

 African-American officeholders during and following the Reconstruction era

References

Year of birth missing
1870 deaths
1800s births
Baptists from Alabama
Baptist ministers from the United States
19th-century American politicians
People from Sumter County, Alabama
Assassinated American politicians
American former slaves
African-American state legislators in Alabama

Assassinated American State House representatives